Reutlingen is an electoral constituency (German: Wahlkreis) represented in the Bundestag. It elects one member via first-past-the-post voting. Under the current constituency numbering system, it is designated as constituency 289. It is located in central Baden-Württemberg, comprising the Reutlingen district.

Reutlingen was created for the inaugural 1949 federal election. Since 2013, it has been represented by Michael Donth of the Christian Democratic Union (CDU).

Geography
Reutlingen is located in central Baden-Württemberg. As of the 2021 federal election, it is coterminous with the Reutlingen district.

History
Reutlingen was created in 1949. In the 1949 election, it was Württemberg-Hohenzollern constituency 1 in the numbering system. In the 1953 through 1961 elections, it was number 190. In the 1965 through 1976 elections, it was number 194. In the 1980 through 1998 elections, it was number 193. In the 2002 and 2005 elections, it was number 290. Since the 2009 election, it has been number 289.

Originally, the constituency comprised the districts of Reutlingen and Tübingen. In the 1965 through 1976 elections, it comprised the Tübingen district and the municipalities of Reutlingen, Eningen unter Achalm, Sonnenbühl, Gomaringen, Engstingen, Lichtenstein, Metzingen, Pfullingen, Riederich, and Wannweil from the Reutlingen district. Since the 1980 election, it has been coterminous with the Reutlingen district.

Members
The constituency has been held by Christian Democratic Union (CDU) during all but one Bundestag term since its creation. It was first represented by Oskar Kalbfell of the Social Democratic Party (SPD) from 1949 to 1953. Gustav-Adolf Gedat won it for the CDU in 1953 and served until 1965, followed by Heiner Geißler for one term. Anton Pfeifer was representative from 1969 to 2002, a total of nine consecutive terms. Ernst-Reinhard Beck then served from 2002 to 2013. Michael Donth was elected in 2013, and re-elected in 2017 and 2021.

Election results

2021 election

2017 election

2013 election

2009 election

References

Federal electoral districts in Baden-Württemberg
1949 establishments in West Germany
Constituencies established in 1949
Reutlingen (district)